Voiello is an Italian food company based in Torre Annunziata, specialized in pasta manufacturing. It operates under Barilla Group as a premium brand.

References

External links 
 

Italian pasta companies
Companies established in 1879
Italian brands
Companies based in Campania
1879 establishments in Italy